Kampong Tanjong Nangka is a village in the west of Brunei-Muara District, Brunei. The population was 3,118 in 2016. It is one of the villages within Mukim Sengkurong. The postcode is BG2321.

References 

Tanjong Nangka